Lost In Translation is the fourth studio album by Danish rock band New Politics, released on October 6, 2017 via DCD2 Records and Warner Bros. Records. Five singles were released prior to the album's release, along with a music video for "One Of Us". The band announced that the new album would focus on life after touring and growing more successful, as well as describing the task of reinventing themselves through the tight bonds that they developed as bandmates over the years.

Track listing

Chart positions

Singles

References

2017 albums
New Politics (band) albums
DCD2 Records albums
Warner Records albums